Margaret Richards may refer to:

Margaret Richards (architect) (1928–2022), Scottish architect
Margaret Richards (bowls), Canadian lawn bowler

See also
Margaret Richardson (disambiguation)